The 1916 Republican National Convention was held in Chicago from June 7 to June 10. A major goal of the party's bosses at the convention was to heal the bitter split within the party that had occurred in the 1912 presidential campaign. In that year, Theodore Roosevelt bolted the GOP and formed his own political party, the Progressive Party, which contained most of the GOP's liberals. William Howard Taft, the incumbent president, won the nomination of the regular Republican Party. This split in the GOP ranks divided the Republican vote and led to the election of Democrat Woodrow Wilson.

Although several candidates were openly competing for the 1916 nomination—most prominently conservative Senator Elihu Root of New York, Senator John W. Weeks of Massachusetts, and liberal Senator Albert Cummins of Iowa—the party's bosses wanted a moderate who would be acceptable to all factions of the party. They turned to Supreme Court Justice Charles Evans Hughes, who had served on the court since 1910 and thus had the advantage of not having publicly spoken about political issues in six years. Although he had not sought the nomination, Hughes made it known that he would not turn it down; he won the presidential nomination on the third ballot. Former Vice President Charles W. Fairbanks was nominated as his running mate.

Hughes is the only Supreme Court Justice to be nominated for president by a major political party. Fairbanks is the last former vice president to be nominated for vice president.

Then-Senator Warren G. Harding is credited with coining the phrase "Founding Fathers" during his keynote address.

Presidential nomination

Presidential candidates 

At the start, Supreme Court Justice Charles Evans Hughes was widely seen as the favorite due to his ability to unite the party, though the nomination of a dark horse candidate such as Massachusetts Senator Henry Cabot Lodge or General Leonard Wood seemed possible. Many Republicans sought to nominate a candidate palatable to Theodore Roosevelt in hopes of averting another third-party run by progressive Republicans, though these Republicans were unwilling to nominate Roosevelt himself. Roosevelt's influence put a stop to the potential presidential candidacies of former Ohio Senator Theodore E. Burton and current Ohio Senator Warren G. Harding. Former Vice President Charles Fairbanks made a run at the presidency and attempted to curry Roosevelt's support, but Roosevelt refused to support Fairbanks. Hughes won the nomination on the third ballot, and Roosevelt chose to forgo a third-party bid.

Presidential Balloting / 3rd Day of Convention (June 9, 1916)

Presidential Balloting / 4th Day of Convention (June 10, 1916)

Vice Presidential nomination

Vice Presidential candidates 

Former Vice President Charles Fairbanks had no interest in serving another term as vice president, but when the party nominated him, he accepted the nomination.

Vice Presidential Balloting / 4th Day of Convention (June 10, 1916)

Coinciding women's suffrage conventions in Chicago
Coinciding with the Republican convention, both the Congressional Union for Woman Suffrage and the National American Woman Suffrage Association held conventions in Chicago.

See also 
 History of the United States Republican Party
 List of Republican National Conventions
 U.S. presidential nomination convention
 Republican Party presidential primaries, 1916
 1916 United States presidential election
 1916 Democratic National Convention

References

Bibliography 

 Official Report of the Proceedings of the Sixteenth Republican National Convention Held in Chicago, Illinois, June 7, 8, 9, and 10, 1916

External links 
 Republican Party platform of 1916 at The American Presidency Project
 http://politicalgraveyard.com/parties/R/1916/index.html

Republican National Conventions
1916 United States presidential election
Political conventions in Chicago
1916 in Illinois
1916 conferences
June 1916 events